Prabath Kariyapperuma (born 10 June 1986) was a Sri Lankan cricketer. He was a right-handed batsman and a right-arm medium-fast bowler who played for Tamil Union Cricket and Athletic Club. He was born in Kadawata. He attended Nalanda College.

Kariyapperuma made a single first-class appearance for the side, during the 2006–07 season, against Ragama Cricket Club. From the tailend, he scored 2 not out in the only innings in which he batted.

Kariyapperuma took three wickets in nine overs with the ball.

References

External links
Prabath Kariyapperuma at CricketArchive 

1986 births
Living people
Sri Lankan cricketers
Tamil Union Cricket and Athletic Club cricketers